Minhinnick is a surname. Notable people with the surname include:

Gordon Minhinnick (1902−1992), New Zealand cartoonist
Ngāneko Minhinnick (1939–2017), New Zealand Māori leader
Robert Minhinnick (born 1952), Welsh poet and translator

English-language surnames